Chempattu is a 2017-2017 Malayalam devotional series aired on Asianet. It started on 10 July 2017 every Monday to Saturdays 9:00 PM. Later, due to the viewership of the series, it was aired every Monday to Fridays 6:30 PM and was abruptly stopped by the channel ended on 20 October 2017 for 78 episodes. The soap opera was replaced by the dubbed version of Tamil Kadavul Murgan

The series tells the stories based on Lalitha Sahasranamam in different stories.
Arya Parvathi, Swathy Nithyanand, Nila Menon and Niranjan Nair plays the lead roles.

Plot
Ilayidath Mana, once a prosperous home and now in ruins, is waiting for the saviour who will bring back its lost glory. Naagamma an old woman invokes Goddess Bhadrakali to find answers to her trouble

Cast
Indulekha as Devi 
Swathy Nithyanand as Devi 
Nila Menon as Savithri 
Kishor as Thrivikraman
Valsala Menon as Nangemma 
Krishnachandran as Vasudevan
Niranjan Nair as Vishnu Dathan
Arya Parvathy as Parvathi
Baby Devaprabha Menon as Devi
Anil Narayan as Lakshmi Narayanan
Stephy as Subhadra
Ravi Krishnan Gopalakrishan as Kemendra Sidhan 
Sumesh Surendran as Govindan 
Maneesh Krishnan as Shiva
Kalyani Nair as Mohini
Renjith Raj as Falgunan
Dileep
Manju Satheesh
Jameela Malik  as Shiva's mother
Amritha as Rudhra

Airing history
The show started airing on Asianet on 10 July 2017 and It aired on Monday to Saturday 9:00 PM IST replacing the time slot of the TV series Bharya. Later its timing changed starting from Monday 31 July 2017, the show was shifted to 6:30 PM IST time slot due to viewers' interest and Bharya took back its prime time slot of 9:00 PM.

External links

Asianet (TV channel) original programming
Malayalam-language television shows
2017 Indian television series debuts
2017 Indian television series endings